Parth Desai (born 11 December 1990) is a Canadian cricketer. He made his One Day International debut for Canada against the West Indies in April 2010. He played for Canada in the 2014 Cricket World Cup Qualifier tournament.

References

External links
Parth Desai at ESPNCricinfo

1990 births
Living people
Canadian cricketers
Canada One Day International cricketers
Canada Twenty20 International cricketers
People from Navsari district
Indian emigrants to Canada
Indian cricketers